Bath Estate Football Club is a Dominica football club based in Roseau. The club competes in the Dominica Premier Division League, the top tier of Dominica football.

The club was the 2010 defending champions.

References 

Football clubs in Dominica